The Gegensteine are crags near the town of Ballenstedt on the northern edge of the Harz Mountains in Germany. There are two: the Großer Gegenstein and Kleiner Gegenstein ("Great Gegenstein" and "Little Gegenstein"). They are striking, free-standing rock pinnacles and outliers of the Teufelsmauer. They lie within the Gegensteine–Schierberg nature reserve.

The Großer Gegenstein can be ascended by means of ladders and steps carved out of the rock. A cross was erected on its summit in 1863 by order of the Prince of Anhalt; it was replaced in 1993. From the summit there are extensive views over the Harz Mountains and its northern foreland.

Near the Kleiner Gegenstein there used to be a site used for driver training purposes by the Gesellschaft für Sport und Technik during East German times.

External links 

Ballenstedt